Darren Toney (born January 9, 1984) is a former professional gridiron football defensive back in the Canadian Football League. He was originally signed by the BC Lions as a street free agent in 2009, but was cut in training camp in June 2010. He played college football for the Arkansas State Red Wolves.

References

External links
Just Sport Stats
Hamilton Tiger-Cats bio

1984 births
Living people
American football defensive backs
American players of Canadian football
Arkansas State Red Wolves football players
BC Lions players
Canadian football defensive backs
People from Lake Village, Arkansas
Peoria Pirates players